Big Spring Cafe is a diner in Huntsville, Alabama. It opened in 1922, and is the oldest restaurant in the city. It is often noted as a landmark in the city and as one of Huntsville's "signature" restaurants. When the original location opened, it served only hamburgers consisting of ground beef, onions, mustard and salt on a roll.

History
The original Big Spring Cafe opened in 1922 at 119 Jefferson Street. It was located in a railroad boxcar near the Big Spring Canal. It then moved to 115 Gallatin Street (where the Von Braun Center parking garage now stands), and then to Governors Drive in 1970. This location provided 16 bar stools at the counter and two long tables for customers. The family relocated the diner to a newly constructed building about one-half mile west, but still on Governors Drive in April, 2017.

Troy Baucom opened the original location in downtown Huntsville in Spring 1922. The restaurant was sold to Hazel Beene in 1946 and, as business left the downtown core for the Memorial Parkway corridor, joined the exodus in 1970. Two years later, Beene turned the restaurant over to her sister and brother-in-law, Doris and Howard Cowley. The Cowleys operated Big Spring Cafe until selling it to their daughter, Pam Milam, in 1992. Citing the age and condition of the current building, Milam announced in March 2008 that she planned to relocate Big Spring Cafe just west on Governors Drive, in "a year or so", taking care to replicate the interior of the cafe in the new location. The move finally happened in April, 2017.

Cuisine
When the original location opened in 1928, it served only hamburgers consisting of ground beef, salt, mustard, and onions on a roll. The current location, tucked between a meat market and a bait shop, offers both breakfast and lunch six days a week and is closed on Sundays. The menu now includes diner staples including hamburgers, hot dogs, and no-bean chili plus Southern specialties like Brunswick stew, slaw dogs, and fried bologna biscuits.  The diner has its own special language for ordering some items. For example, a "hamburger with cheese" is a ground beef patty with mustard and onions on a square bun while a "cheeseburger" is a ground beef patty plus lettuce, tomato, and mayonnaise on a round bun. A bowl with equal portions of chili and Brunswick stew is ordered as "half and half" while that mix with slightly more chili is a "60–40".

See also
 List of hamburger restaurants
 List of Southern restaurants

References

Companies based in Huntsville, Alabama
Restaurants in Alabama
Hamburger restaurants
Restaurants established in 1928
American companies established in 1928
Southern restaurants
Tourist attractions in Huntsville, Alabama
1928 establishments in Alabama
Diners in the United States